The Young Flying Fox is a wuxia novel by Jin Yong (Louis Cha). The novel was first serialised in Hong Kong in 1960 in the magazine Wuxia and History. The novel is a prequel to Fox Volant of the Snowy Mountain and was written a year after its literary predecessor.

Plot 
The story is set in China during the reign of the Qianlong Emperor (1735–1796) of the Qing dynasty. The protagonist, Hu Fei, is a young martial artist who was raised by Ping Asi after the death of his father, Hu Yidao. While travelling around the land in search of adventure, Hu Fei encounters Feng Tiannan, a ruthless villain, and wants to kill him to avenge the victims. He also meets a young maiden, Yuan Ziyi, who shows signs of affection towards him and stops him every time he comes close to killing Feng Tiannan.

Based on what Ping Asi told him, Hu Fei believes that Miao Renfeng is responsible for his father's death. He refrains from killing Miao after finding him, because Miao has been tricked by an enemy and temporarily blinded by a deadly poison. He is so impressed with Miao's sense of chivalry that he starts wondering if Ping Asi was mistaken about Miao. He decides to help Miao find a cure for his eyes and encounters Cheng Lingsu, an apprentice of a deceased medicine guru known as the "King of Venoms". After he witnesses her defeating her three wicked seniors with her calm and wit, she agrees to help him heal Miao's eyes.

When Miao Renfeng regains his sight, he confesses that he killed Hu Yidao by accident several years ago. Hu Fei is filled with sorrow upon hearing the truth and he leaves with Cheng Lingsu, who becomes his sworn sister. While travelling together, they chance upon an election for a new leader of the wulin (martial artists' community) hosted by the general Fuk'anggan. The election is part of Fuk'anggan's plan to instigate turmoil in the wulin and ensure that they will not pose a threat to the Qing government. Hu Fei and Cheng Lingsu disguise themselves and participate in the event. With help from Yuan Ziyi, they expose Fuk'anggan's plot and disrupt the election.

They are attacked by enemies and Hu Fei is poisoned while shielding Cheng Lingsu with his body. Cheng loses her life trying to save Hu and reveals to him before dying that she loves him. Hu is filled with anguish after hearing that. After Cheng's funeral, he meets Yuan Ziyi, who tells him that she had already taken an oath to be a Buddhist nun in her childhood, and hence cannot be together with him even though she loves him. She places her palms together and recites a silent prayer for him before leaving.

Characters

Protagonists 
 Hu Fei is the son of Hu Yidao and the protagonist.
 Hu Yidao is a forthright and gregarious hero whose skills are legendary. He hopes to resolve the past feuds between the four families that have lasted since their ancestors' time. He is instigated into a fight with Miao Renfeng but becomes friends with his foe. He is accidentally killed by Miao Renfeng as Miao's weapon had been secretly smeared with poison.
 Miao Renfeng, nicknamed "Golden Faced Buddha" and "Undefeated Champion", is a powerful martial artist of equal fame as Hu Yidao. A man of few words, he does not know how to express his feelings well. He fights with Hu Yidao and is so impressed by the latter's chivalry and skill that they become friends. His enemies secretly smear poison on his weapon and he accidentally kills Hu Yidao after inflicting the latter with a minor cut.
 Cheng Lingsu is the apprentice of the "King of Venoms". She falls in love with Hu Fei when she first meets him while he was searching for a cure for Miao Renfeng. Later, she follows Hu Fei on his adventures and becomes his close companion. She gives up her life to save Hu Fei after he is poisoned. Hu Fei is deeply saddened by her loss and he buries her beside his parents' grave.
 Yuan Ziyi, also known as Yuanxing, is Feng Tiannan's illegitimate daughter. Her mother gave birth to her after being raped by Feng Tiannan and was forced to commit suicide by Tang Pei. She vows to avenge her mother and kill her beastly father. However, she needs to fulfil a promise to save his life thrice before she can kill him. Having taken an oath to be a Buddhist nun in her childhood, she cannot be together with Hu Fei even though she loves him.

Antagonists 
 Fuk'anggan is a Manchu general who appears to be generous and gentlemanly, but is in fact a scheming, selfish and ruthless person. He organises an election for a leader of the wulin (martial artists' community) with the secret intention of stirring up conflict in the wulin when martial artists fight for the position of leader, thus ensuring that the wulin will not pose a threat to the government. He has a affair with Ma Chunhua and has a pair of twin boys with her.
 Tian Guinong is a descendant of one of the four bodyguards of Li Zicheng. An immoral, unscrupulous and flirtatious villain, he seduces Nan Lan and causes her to abandon her husband and marry him instead. Seeking wealth and fame, he pledges allegiance to Fuk'anggan, who promises to help him become leader of the wulin in return for his loyalty and service.
 Feng Tiannan is a ruthless and cruel villain, who uses his wealth and authority to bully people. Hu Fei seeks to kill him to avenge Zhong Asi and his family, who had been murdered by Feng. He is rescued by his illegitimate daughter Yuan Ziyi, who has made a promise to save his life thrice before killing him to avenge her mother. He dies in the chaotic fight during the election for the leader of the wulin.
 Shi Wanchen is the evil junior of the "King of Venoms". He causes the death of Cheng Lingsu, but is blinded by her and meets his end at the hands of Zeng Tieou.

Others 
 Nan Lan is Miao Renfeng's wife. She feels unhappy after marrying Miao Renfeng, who leads a simple and frugal life as opposed to her luxurious lifestyle before her marriage. After she is seduced by Tian Guinong, she abandons her husband and marries Tian.
 Ping Asi is a young man indebted to Hu Yidao, who saved his life. He risks his life to save the infant Hu Fei and raises Hu after the latter's parents died. A humble, unassuming and shy man, he often feels inferior to others.
 The "King of Venoms", who is mentioned by name only, was a herbal medicine guru who imparted his knowledge to Cheng Lingsu, the only one among his apprentices who did not betray him.
 Ma Chunhua is an old friend of Hu Fei who helped him years ago during the incident at the Shang Family Castle. She has an affair with Fuk'anggan and secretly bore him a pair of twin boys. Fuk'anggan sent his men, disguised as bandits, to kill her husband and seize the boys from her. Hu Fei helps her and the twins escape from Fuk'anggan's clutches.
 Zhao Banshan, a character from The Book and the Sword, is the third leader of the Red Flower Society. He meets the young Hu Fei at the Shang Family Castle and they become sworn brothers after escaping death together.
 Tang Pei is a guest at the election for the leader of the wulin. Initially a popular man, he is blackmailed by Yuan Ziyi and becomes despised by everyone after his dirty secrets are revealed.
 Murong Jingyue and Xue Que are the apprentices of the "King of Venoms" and Cheng Lingsu's seniors. They betrayed their master and acknowledged Shi Wanchen as their new master.
 Shang Jianming, who is mentioned by name only, was the master of the Shang Family Castle who was killed by Hu Yidao several years ago. Hu Fei stumbles upon the castle and runs into trouble with Shang Jianming's widow and followers when they learn that he is Hu Yidao's son.
 Zhong Asi is a peasant who owns a vegetable farm. Feng Tiannan has been eyeing his farm and intends to seize that plot of land for himself. Feng accuses Zhong's son of stealing and eating a goose from his house. Zhong's wife kills the boy and cuts open his belly in a desperate measure to prove that their son is innocent. Zhong and his wife are murdered by Feng Tiannan later.
 Chen Jialuo is the protagonist of The Book and the Sword and the chief of the Red Flower Society. When he first meets Hu Fei, he is mistaken for Fuk'anggan (his nephew) due to their similar appearances. Zhao Banshan later clarifies the misunderstanding.

Adaptations

Films

Television 

Side Story of Fox Volant (2022)

Radio drama 
In 2021, CNR was the first wuxia radio drama presentation aired in China about April 12th everyday 21:31 Beijing time.

References 

1960 novels
Novels by Jin Yong
Novels first published in serial form
Works originally published in Chinese magazines
 
Novels set in the Qing dynasty
Prequel novels
Buddhist novels